James George Clarko  (21 July 1932 – 7 April 2020) was an Australian politician. He was a Liberal Party member of the Western Australian Legislative Assembly from 1974 to 1996, representing the electorates of Karrinyup (1974–1989) and Marmion (1989–1996).

He was Speaker of the Legislative Assembly from 1993 to 1996, and also served a stint as state Minister for Education in the early 1980s.

He received the Member of the Order of Australia award in June 2006 "for service to the Western Australian Parliament serving in various parliamentary positions, including Speaker of the Legislative Assembly, and to the community of the City of Stirling."

References

1932 births
2020 deaths
Liberal Party of Australia members of the Parliament of Western Australia
Members of the Western Australian Legislative Assembly
Politicians from Perth, Western Australia
People educated at Trinity College, Perth
University of Western Australia alumni
Members of the Order of Australia